Teresa de Lauretis (born 1938 in Bologna) is an Italian author and Distinguished Professor Emerita of the History of Consciousness at the University of California, Santa Cruz. Her areas of interest include semiotics, psychoanalysis, film theory, literary theory, feminism, women's studies, lesbian- and queer studies. She has also written on science fiction. Fluent in English and Italian, she writes in both languages. Additionally, her work has been translated into sixteen other languages.

De Lauretis received her doctorate in Modern Languages and Literatures from Bocconi University in Milan before coming to the United States. She joined the History of Consciousness with Hayden White, Donna Haraway, Fredric Jameson and Angela Davis. Has held Visiting Professorships at universities worldwide including ones in Canada, Germany, Italy, Sweden, Austria, Argentina, Chile, France, Spain, Hungary, Croatia, Mexico and the Netherlands. 
She currently lives in San Francisco, CA, but often spends time in Italy and the Netherlands.

Theories

De Lauretis' account of subjectivity as a product of "being subject/ed to semiosis" (i.e., making meanings and being made by them) helps to theoretically resolve and overcome the tension between the human action (agency) and structure. She makes use of Umberto Eco's reading of C.S. Peirce in order to establish her notion of semiotics of experience. She brings corporeality back to the discourse on the constitution of subjectivity which has been conceived mainly in the linguistic terms. Her semiotics is not just the semiotics of language but also the semiotics of visual images and non-verbal practices. Her (Peircean) "habit" or "habit-change" is often compared to Bourdieu's notion of habitus.

Michel Foucault’s analysis of body excludes the consideration of the specificity of the female body that many feminists have criticized. Supplementing the failure, gender should be one of the effects of technology which renders the basic intelligibility of body and that turns to de Lauretis’ "technology of gender".
de Lauretis coined the term "queer theory" although the way in which it is used today differs from what she originally suggested by the term.
Although she coined the term she abandoned it barely three years later, on the grounds that it had been taken over by those mainstream forces and institutions it was coined to resist.

Honors, awards and grants

 Guest of honour, Universidad Nacional del Litoral, Argentina (2014)
 Doctor honoris causa, Universidad Nacional de Córdoba, Argentina (2014)
 Distinguished Career Award, Society for Cinema and Media Studies (2010)
 Winner, Choice Magazine Outstanding Reference/Academic Book Award (2009)
 IHR Humanities Research Fellowship (2007)
 Doctor of Philosophy honoris causa, University of Lund, Sweden (2005)
 UCHRI Resident Faculty Fellowship, University of California, Irvine (2003-2004) 
 Guggenheim Fellowship (1993)
 NEH Fellowship for University Teachers (1992)
 Conference Grant, Humanities Division, University of California, Santa Cruz (1990)
 Conference Grant, Research Council of Canada (1884)
 Research Fellowship, Center for Twentieth Century Studies, University of Wisconsin—Milwaukee (1982–83)
 Grant in Media Studies, National Endowment for the Arts (1977–78)

Bibliography
Books (English)

Freud's Drive: Psychoanalysis, Literature, and Film (2008)
Figures of Resistance: Essays in Feminist Theory (2007)
The Practice of Love: Lesbian Sexuality and Perverse Desire (1994)
Technologies of Gender: Essays on Theory, Film, and Fiction (1987)
Feminist Studies/Critical Studies (1986)
Alice Doesn't: Feminism, Semiotics, Cinema (1984)
The Cinematic Apparatus (1980)
The Technological Imagination (1980)

Anthologies or collections she edited or co-edited

Feminist Studies/Critical Studies (1986)
The Cinematic Apparatus (1980)
The Technological Imagination (1980)

Journals

 Guest-edited "Queer Theory" issue of differences: A Journal of Feminist Cultural Studies (1991)
(with David Allen) "Theoretical Perspectives in Cinema" issue of Ciné-Tracts:  A Journal of Film and Cultural Studies (1977).

Books (Italian)
La sintassi del desiderio: struttura e forme del romanzo sveviano (Ravenna: Longo, 1976)
Umberto Eco (Firenze: La Nuova Italia, 1981)
Sui generis (Milano: Feltrinelli, 1996)
Pratica d'amore : percorsi del desiderio perverso (Milano: Tartaruga, 1997)
Soggetti eccentrici (Milano: Feltrinelli, 1999)

References

External links

Teresa de Lauretis (Official Webpage)
Teresa de Lauretis
Teresa de Lauretis at UCSC

1938 births
Living people
American women writers
Bocconi University alumni
Critical theorists
Feminist writers
Film theorists
Italian emigrants to the United States
Italian feminists
Italian women writers
Postmodern feminists
Poststructuralists
Queer theorists
University of California, Santa Cruz faculty
University of Colorado faculty